Kevon Edmonds (born February 25, 1958) is an American singer. He is member of the R&B group After 7 and the older brother of singer, songwriter, and record producer Kenneth "Babyface" Edmonds.  After 7 scored three platinum- or gold-selling albums, several R&B hits and multiple Billboard Hot 100 hits.  Kevon Edmonds released the solo album 24/7 in 1999.  The album's title track was certified gold and was a No. 2 R&B hit and reached No. 10 on the Billboard Hot 100.  The second single, "No Love (I'm Not Used to)" was a moderate R&B hit.  Edmonds was also a member of the quintet Milestone along with his brothers Babyface and Melvin Edmonds and K-Ci & JoJo.  The group only released one single, "I Care 'Bout You", for the Soul Food movie soundtrack.

Biography
Edmonds was born in Indianapolis in 1958 to Marvin Edmonds Sr. and Barbara Edmonds.  He is the fourth born of six sons.  He had three older brothers Marvin Jr., Melvin and Michael and two younger brothers Kenny "Babyface" and Derek.  Edmonds graduated from North Central High School and Indiana University Bloomington.  At Indiana University he was a member of the Soul Revue, where he met his future After 7 groupmate Keith Mitchell.  Kevon and Keith decided to form a group as a hobby and add Kevon's brother Melvin.  For years after college Edmonds worked at Eli Lilly and Co., but he would come together with Keith and Melvin to perform locally.  By the late 1980s, Edmonds' younger brother Babyface had built a successful career singing, writing and producing.  He invited Melvin, Kevon and Keith out to Los Angeles, named them After 7, and got them a record deal with Virgin Records.

After 7 and Milestone

As a member of After 7, Edmonds had successes earning platinum albums as well as several gold singles. They continued to tour the country and established themselves as one of R&B's top-performing groups. After their 1995 album, Reflections, After 7 left Virgin Records due to issues with the label. The departure from Virgin Records allowed the members to pursue their own personal projects and over time, saw the group separate.

Edmonds then appeared with Babyface and K-Ci & JoJo for a project in a fictional group called Milestone. The group performed in the movie Soul Food and had a hit single with the track "I Care About You". For a brief period, Milestone nearly became a real group, instead of just the fictional group portrayed in the movie, but label conflicts caused the project to collapse.

After his first solo album Edmonds invited his nephew Jason Edmonds, son of Melvin, to tour with him as a background singer for years.  By the late 2000s, After 7 resumed touring with Jason replacing his father.  However, the group decided not to record again without the participation of Melvin.  Melvin was able to reunite with the group on the 2015 single "I Want You", and a full comeback album Timeless was released in October 2016.

Solo career

In 1999, Edmonds released his first solo album, 24/7. The title track from the album was a big hit, going gold and reaching No. 10 on the Hot 100. The album's second single, "No Love (I'm Not Used to)", performed moderately well, reaching No. 25 on the R&B charts.

Edmonds' second solo CD, Who Knew, was released on October 13, 2009, through Make Entertainment/Image Distribution. The first single was released in early August and is titled "Oh."

Discography
24/7 (1999)
Who Knew (2009)

References

External links
 Official website
 Kevin Edmonds on Twitter

Living people
American contemporary R&B singers
20th-century African-American male singers
American male singers
American tenors
Countertenors
Musicians from Indianapolis
1958 births
Singers from Indiana
21st-century African-American people